{{Automatic taxobox
| image = Leptura quadrifasciata (female).jpg
| image_caption = Leptura quadrifasciata (female)
| taxon = Leptura
| authority = Linnaeus, 1758
| synonyms =
 Nakanea Ohbayashi 1963 	 
 Stenura Haldeman 1847 	 
 Strangaliella Hayashi 1976 	 
 Strangalia LeConte 1850
}}Leptura is a genus of beetles in the family Cerambycidae, containing the following species:
 
 Leptura abdominalis (Haldeman, 1847)
 Leptura adami Hergovits 2020
 Leptura aethiops (Poda 1761)
 Leptura akitai Fujita 2018
 Leptura alticola Gressitt, 1948
 Leptura amamiana Hayashi 1960
 Leptura ambulatrix (Gressitt, 1951)
 Leptura annularis Fabricius, 1801
 Leptura arcifera (Blanchard, 1871)
 Leptura atrimembris (Pic, 1923)
 Leptura auratopilosa (Matsushita, 1931)
 Leptura aureolella Holzschuh 2009
 Leptura aurosericans Fairmaire, 1895
 Leptura aurulenta Fabricius, 1792
 Leptura barkamica Holzschuh, 1998
 Leptura bocakorum Holzschuh, 1998
 Leptura cordis Hayashi & Villiers 1985
 Leptura daliensis Holzschuh, 1998
 Leptura dembickyi Hergovits 2020
 Leptura dimorpha Bates 1873
 Leptura doii (Matsushita, 1933)
 Leptura duodecimguttata Fabricius, 1801
 Leptura formosomontana Kano, 1933
 Leptura gorodinskii Hergovits 2020
 Leptura gradatula Holzschuh, 2006
 Leptura grahamiana Gressitt, 1938
 Leptura guerryi Pic, 1902
 Leptura hovorei Linsley & Chemsak, 1976
 Leptura jendeki Hergovits 2020
 Leptura kabateki Hergovits 2020
 Leptura kerniana Fall, 1907
 Leptura kopai Tichy, Viktora & Ohbayashi 2019
 Leptura kubani Holzschuh, 2006
 Leptura kurinai Hergovits 2020
 Leptura kusamai Ohbayashi & Nakane, 1955
 Leptura latipennis Matsushita, 1933
 Leptura lavinia Gahan, 1906
 Leptura linwenhsini Ohbayshi & Chou, 2013
 Leptura longeattenuata Pic, 1939
 Leptura longipennis Staatz 1938
 Leptura marceli Hergovits 2020
 Leptura masegakii (Kano, 1933)
 Leptura mimica Bates, 1884
 Leptura modicenotata (Pic, 1901)
 Leptura naxi Holzschuh, 1998
 Leptura nigroguttata (Pic, 1927)
 Leptura ochraceofasciata Motschulsky, 1861
 Leptura pacifica (Linsley, 1940)
 Leptura petramarketae Viktora & Hergovits 2021
 †Leptura petrorum Wickham, 1912
 †Leptura ponderosissima Wickham, 1913
 Leptura quadrifasciata Linnaeus, 1758
 Leptura quadrizona (Fairmaire, 1902)
 Leptura regalis (Bates, 1884)
 Leptura rufoannulata (Pic, 1933)
 Leptura semiannulata (Pic, 1916) 	
 Leptura semicornis Holzschuh, 2003
 Leptura sequoiae (Hopping, 1934)
 Leptura submarginata Pic 1920
 Leptura subtilis Bates, 1884
 Leptura taranan (Kano, 1933)
 Leptura tattakana (Kano, 1933)
 Leptura viktorai Hergovits 2020
 Leptura yakushimana Tamanuki, 1942
 Leptura yulongshana Holzschuh, 1991
 Leptura zonifera'' (Blanchard, 1871)

References

Lepturinae